Eray Birniçan (born 20 July 1988) is a Turkish professional footballer who plays as a goalkeeper for TFF Second League club Kastamonuspor 1966. He is also a former youth international.

References

External links
 
 

1988 births
People from Bakırköy
Footballers from Istanbul
21st-century Turkish people
Living people
Turkish footballers
Turkey youth international footballers
Turkey under-21 international footballers
Association football goalkeepers
Yıldırım Bosna S.K. footballers
Konyaspor footballers
Samsunspor footballers
Gaziantepspor footballers
Çaykur Rizespor footballers
Kasımpaşa S.K. footballers
Alanyaspor footballers
Süper Lig players
TFF First League players
TFF Second League players